Fotoksar or Photoksar is a village in the Leh district of Ladakh, India. It is located in the Khalsi tehsil.

Location
On the way towards Lamayuru monastery from Leh, a road left towards Wanla leaving the main Kargil-Leh highway, which goes further to Sirsir-La pass and then to Photoksar. The Sisir-La pass is open only in summers. So, in winters this village is cut off from the outside world.

Demographics 
According to the 2011 census of India, Fotoksar has 48 households. The effective literacy rate (i.e. the literacy rate of population excluding children aged 6 and below) is 71.23%.

References

Villages in Khalsi tehsil